Ragtime is a 1981 American drama film directed by Miloš Forman, based on the 1975 historical novel Ragtime by E.L. Doctorow. The film is set in and around turn-of-the-century New York City, New Rochelle, and Atlantic City, and includes fictionalized references to actual people and events of the time. The film stars James Cagney, Mary Steenburgen, Howard Rollins, Brad Dourif, James Olson and Elizabeth McGovern, features the final film appearances of Cagney and Pat O'Brien, and features early appearances in small parts by Jeff Daniels, Fran Drescher, Samuel L. Jackson, Ethan Phillips and John Ratzenberger.

Plot 
At the turn of the 20th century, architect Stanford White unveils a nude statue atop Madison Square Garden, modeled after former chorus girl Evelyn Nesbit. After learning of this, Nesbit's husband, billionaire industrialist Harry Kendall Thaw, becomes convinced White has corrupted her and publicly shoots him dead.

An upper-class family resides in New Rochelle, New York, where Father owns a factory where his wife's Younger Brother makes fireworks. An African American baby is abandoned in their garden, and upon learning the police intend to charge the child's mother, Sarah, with child abandonment and attempted murder, Mother takes Sarah and her child into the home despite Father's objections. Ragtime pianist Coalhouse Walker arrives in search of Sarah, driving a new Ford Model T, and realizing he is the baby's father, announces his intention to marry Sarah.

Younger Brother witnesses White's murder and becomes obsessed with Evelyn. Thaw's lawyer Delmas bribes Evelyn with a million-dollar divorce settlement to keep silent about Thaw's mental instability and to testify that White abused her. Passing through the Lower East Side, Evelyn encounters street artist Tateh, who throws out his unfaithful wife. He leaves New York with their daughter and sells the flip book he created. Evelyn and Younger Brother begin an affair as she prepares her return to the stage, while he assumes they will eventually marry. After Thaw is found not guilty by reason of temporary insanity, his lawyers inform Evelyn that Thaw will sue her for divorce on the grounds of infidelity and she accepts a smaller settlement. The affair ends, leaving Younger Brother adrift.

In New Rochelle, Coalhouse is targeted by bigoted volunteer firemen led by Willie Conklin, who refuse to allow his automobile to pass by. Coalhouse finds a policeman and returns to find his car soiled with horse manure. Coalhouse attempts to force the policeman to intervene, but the policeman insists that Coalhouse should clean the manure off his car and move on, giving him the choice to do so or be arrested. Coalhouse refuses, and is hauled in to the local precinct. After Father arranges for Coalhouse's release, they discover his car has been further vandalized. Coalhouse pursues legal action, but can find no lawyer willing to represent him. Father and Younger Brother argue over Coalhouse's legal recourse. At a presidential rally, Sarah attempts to tell President Roosevelt about Coalhouse's case but is beaten by guards and dies.

After Sarah's funeral, Coalhouse and his supporters kill several firemen. He threatens to attack other firehouses, demanding his car be restored and Conklin be turned over to him. Father is disgusted at the violence but Younger Brother joins Coalhouse's gang with his knowledge of explosives. Ostracized by their own white community and hounded by reporters, Father and Mother leave for Atlantic City. They encounter Tateh, now a film director on a photoplay with Evelyn. Mother is attracted to Tateh and she and Father quarrel. Coalhouse's gang hold the Pierpont Morgan Library's collection hostage. Police Commissioner Rhinelander Waldo sends for Coalhouse's child as a bargaining chip but Mother refuses to give him up. Father demands she turn the child over and returns to New York to assist Waldo and Mother leaves.

Booker T. Washington fails to persuade Coalhouse to surrender, as does Father. Conklin is captured by police and forced to apologize to Coalhouse. Waldo is disgusted by Conklin's bigotry but cannot submit to terrorist demands and has him arrested. Coalhouse agrees to surrender if Waldo permits his supporters to depart in his restored car and Waldo agrees after Father volunteers to stay as a hostage. Coalhouse's supporters escape and he drives Father out of the library. Ready to blow himself up, Coalhouse instead surrenders but is shot dead on Waldo's orders. The film ends with another newsreel: Evelyn dances in vaudeville and Thaw is released from an asylum. Houdini escapes from a straitjacket several stories above the ground, while newspapers announce that the First World War has begun. Younger Brother returns to his fireworks job and Father watches from the house in New Rochelle as Mother departs with Tateh and Coalhouse's son.

Cast 
The film is notable for introducing numerous actors for whom this was one of their first appearances in an American film: Samuel L. Jackson, Debbie Allen, Jeff Daniels, Andreas Katsulas, Ethan Phillips, Stuart Milligan, and Mandy Patinkin. Additionally, it was the final film of James Cagney and Pat O'Brien. Cagney had not acted in a film for 20 years before his appearance in Ragtime.

Production 

The film was shot on location in New York City; Mount Kisco, New York; New Jersey; and at Shepperton Studios, UK. Robert Altman initially signed to direct the film, but was replaced by Forman.

Reception 
The film holds an aggregated score of 83% from Rotten Tomatoes, based on 18 reviews, and a 57/100 from Metacritic, indicating mixed or average reviews. Roger Ebert gave the film three-and-a-half out of four stars, writing that "'Ragtime' is a loving, beautifully mounted, graceful film that creates its characters with great clarity. We understand where everyone stands, and most of the time we even know why." Vincent Canby gave the film a more mixed review, praising the performances and cinematography but criticizing Forman's narrative choices that created an unclear sense of time and prioritized certain storylines at the cost of others: "[Ragtime] is sorrowful, funny and beautiful. It is also, finally, very unsatisfactory." Christopher Null gave the film a negative review, calling it "a jumbled and largely uninteresting mess".

Awards and honors

Others 
The film is recognized by American Film Institute in these lists:
 2003: AFI's 100 Years...100 Heroes & Villains:
 Coalhouse Walker, Jr. – Nominated
 2005: AFI's 100 Years of Film Scores – Nominated

See also 
 Ragtime – the Tony-winning musical adaptation

References

External links 
 
 
 
 

1981 films
1981 drama films
American drama films
Films scored by Randy Newman
Films based on American novels
Films directed by Miloš Forman
Films set in the 1900s
Films set in New York City
Films set in New Jersey
Films set in Westchester County, New York
Films shot in New York (state)
Films shot in New Jersey
Paramount Pictures films
Films produced by Dino De Laurentiis
Cultural depictions of Booker T. Washington
Cultural depictions of Harry Houdini
Cultural depictions of Theodore Roosevelt
Films about racism
Films set in the 1910s
Ragtime films
1980s English-language films
1980s American films
Films set in Atlantic City, New Jersey